Fangclub are an alternative rock band formed in Rush, Dublin, signed to Vertigo Records.

History
Fangclub are a Dublin alternative rock band with members Steven King (guitar/vocals), Kevin Keane (bass) and Dara Coleman (drums). In keeping with the punk/grunge style of their music, Fangclub took a D.I.Y. approach to their burgeoning career by packing themselves off to the coastal village of Ballyheigue in Kerry to record over 25 tracks. In early 2015 while on one of their DIY tours, they came to the attention of Universal Music's Irish team. Suitably impressed that Fangclub had already recorded an albums worth of music, Universal signed the band in August 2015. Largely comprising songs from their original D.I.Y. efforts, their second EP, Coma Happy, appeared in 2016.

They then took to the road, headlining a sold out show at Whelan's, Dublin and concluding the festival season with two sets at Electric Picnic. Fangclub made their U.K. live debut in 2016 with Welsh group Pretty Vicious, and also toured with Twin Atlantic. 

Their self-titled debut album was released in 2017. The album reached number 5 on the Irish album charts and received positive reviews from critics, with The Irish Times calling it "one of the best hard rock albums of 2017". In January 2018, the album was nominated for the Choice Music Prize.

On the live circuit, Fangclub have supported bands such as Metallica, Smashing Pumpkins, Pixies, Muse, Biffy Clyro, Twin Atlantic, Nothing But Thieves, The Cribs, Swmrs and Frank Carter and The Rattlesnakes.

The band released their second album Vulture Culture on 5 July 2019. Vulture Culture received positive reviews, with Hot Press writing; "this 11-track opus is most certainly the jewel in the Irish alt-rock kings’ crown to date."

Reception

NME have stated that "Fangclub are a fully formed thrash pop monster; melodic, frenzied and phenomenal. Imagine a beefed-up Tribes, or Cloverfield glam. If Fontaines are piloting the new Irish punk blitz, Fangclub are the Big Boys in the bomb bay." The Guardian wrote that the group "are obviously a leftover band from the 90s grunge scene who slipped through some sort of time portal and are stuck here, thrashing their guitars against the raging of the sun."

Members
Current
 Steven King – lead vocals, guitar (2013–present)
 Kevin Keane – bass guitar (2013–present)
 Dara Coleman – drums, percussion (2013–present)

Touring Members
 Ed Scanlan – guitar (2019–present)

Discography

Studio albums

Singles / EPs

Awards and nominations

Choice Music Prize

References

External links
 

2013 establishments in Ireland
Musical groups established in 2013
Irish musical trios